Mowladad Zehi (also Romanized as Mowlādād Zehī; also known as Mowlā Dād Bāzār) is a village in Polan Rural District, Polan District, Chabahar County, Sistan and Baluchestan Province, Iran. At the 2006 census, its population was 196, in 38 families.

References 

Populated places in Chabahar County